"I Love You's" is a song by American singer Hailee Steinfeld, released on March 26, 2020, by Republic Records. The song samples "No More I Love You's" by Annie Lennox, thus David Freeman and Joseph Hughes are credited as songwriters. The song was produced by David Stewart (not to be confused with the Eurythmics' Dave Stewart) and serves as the second single from Steinfeld's second EP Half Written Story (2020).

Background 
Steinfeld released an album cover, as well as dropping the name for the song on Instagram on March 24, 2020, with the caption "i love you's • march 26th". According to Rolling Stone, the song was inspired by Annie Lennox's "No More 'I Love You's" (1995). "Steinfeld spoke to EW about what inspired the song:

Composition 
The song features "floaty synths" and "peppy beats". Lyrically, it is about self-love and hope and is composed in the key of Emajor with a tempo of 107 beats per minute.

Music video 
A lyric video, created by Katia Temkin, accompanied the song's release. Steinfeld co-directed the song's official music video with Sarah McColgan, which premiered via YouTube on March 31, 2020. The music video shot in black-and-white featuring Steinfeld wearing see-through clothing while embedded with white background in studio.

Live performances 
During the COVID-19 pandemic, Steinfeld performed the song in an at-home edition of The Tonight Show Starring Jimmy Fallon on May 1, 2020.

Credits and personnel 
Song credits adapted from Tidal.

 Hailee Steinfeld – vocals
 David Stewart – songwriting, production, programming
 David Freeman – songwriting
 Jessica Agombar – songwriting
 Joseph Hughes – songwriting
 Sarah "Griff" Griffiths – songwriting
 John Hanes – engineering, studio personnel
 Randy Merrill – mastering, studio personnel
 Serban Ghenea – mixing, studio personnel

Charts

Release history

References

2020 songs
2020 singles
Hailee Steinfeld songs
Black-and-white music videos
Republic Records singles
Songs written by David Freeman (musician)
Songs written by Griff (singer)
Songs written by Joseph Hughes (musician)